is a former Japanese football player and manager. He played for Japan national team. He also managed Japan national team.

Club career
Shimomura was born in Hiroshima on January 25, 1932. After graduating from Shudo High School, he joined his local club Toyo Industries in 1950. The club won the 2nd place at 1954 and 1957 Emperor's Cup. At 1954 Emperor's Cup, it was first Emperor's Cup finalist as a works team. He retired in 1961.

National team career
On October 9, 1955, Shimomura debuted for Japan national team against Burma. In 1956, he was selected Japan for 1956 Summer Olympics in Melbourne. But did not compete, as he was the team's reserve goalkeeper behind Yoshio Furukawa.

Coaching career
After retirement, Shimomura became a manager for Toyo Industries in 1964. In 1965, Toyo Industries joined new league Japan Soccer League. In 1965 season, the club won first champions in the league. He led the club through their first golden era as five-time champions of the league (1965, 1966, 1967, 1968 and 1970). He led the club to win the 1965, 1967 and 1969 Emperor's Cup. He resigned in 1970. In 1972, he signed with Towa Real Estate was promoted to new league Japan Soccer League Division 2 from 1972. He managed the club for three seasons until 1974. In 1979, he was named manager for the Japan national team as successor to Hiroshi Ninomiya. However, at 1980 Asian Olympic Qualifying Tournaments, following Japan's failure to qualify for 1980 Summer Olympics, he resigned.

National team statistics

References

External links
 
 Japan National Football Team Database

1932 births
Living people
Association football people from Hiroshima Prefecture
Japanese footballers
Japan international footballers
Japan Soccer League players
Sanfrecce Hiroshima players
Olympic footballers of Japan
Footballers at the 1956 Summer Olympics
Japanese football managers
Japan national football team managers
Association football goalkeepers
Hibakusha